Chabimura also known as Chakwrakma or Chakrakma is famous for its panels of rock carving on steep mountain wall on the bank of Gomati river in Indian state Tripura. There are huge carved images of Shiva, Vishnu, Kartika, Mahisasura Mardini Durga and other Gods and Goddesses.

It is situated on the bank of Gomati river at Haakwchak or Haakchak, Amarpur subdivision under Gomati district, 82 km away from main city and capital Agartala, Tripura, India, 30 km away from Udaipur and 7.5 km away from Amarpur.

Durga in Chabimura
The biggest idol of Maa Durga in rock carvings is about 20 feet high. The carvings images date back to 15-16th centuries.

Beautiful images are curved with a lot of dexterity on the rocky faces of Devtamura which is steep at 90 degrees. The hill ranges are covered with thick jungles and one can reach this abode of gods only after trekking through these jungles.

See also 
 Hindu pilgrimage sites
 National Geological Monuments of India
 List of Hindu temples
 Tourism in India
 Yatra

References

External links

Gomati district
Archaeological sites in Tripura
Hindu pilgrimage sites
Tourist attractions in Tripura
Tourism in Northeast India
Rock art in India
Rock reliefs in India
Shiva in art